The Swift Vox 4 (trademarked in capitals as VOX 4G) is a smartphone developed by the Swift Corporation. It is the second phone sold in the United States that can use a WiMAX network, which the mobile phone carrier Clear is branded as a 4G network.

It is powered by a 1 GHz Snapdragon processor and runs the Android operating system, version 2.1. It includes a 320x 480 true color display capacitive touchscreen screen, an HD camera, which can record 720p and 1080p video, in the rear and VGA camera in the front, a kickstand for media viewing, and an 1080p HDMI output port to connect to a high-definition television.

References 

Mobile phones introduced in 2010
Android (operating system) devices
Linux-based devices